The canton of Vallon-Pont-d'Arc is an administrative division of the Ardèche department, southern France. Its borders were modified at the French canton reorganisation which came into effect in March 2015. Its seat is in Vallon-Pont-d'Arc.

It consists of the following communes:
 
Balazuc
Bessas
Chassiers
Chauzon
Chazeaux
Grospierres
Joannas
Labastide-de-Virac
Labeaume
Lagorce
Largentière
Laurac-en-Vivarais
Montréal
Orgnac-l'Aven
Pradons
Prunet
Rochecolombe
Rocher
Ruoms
Saint-Alban-Auriolles
Saint-Maurice-d'Ardèche
Saint-Remèze
Salavas
Sampzon
Sanilhac
Tauriers
Uzer
Vagnas
Vallon-Pont-d'Arc
Vogüé

References

Cantons of Ardèche